Erysimum jugicola is a plant  of the family Brassicaceae.

Distribution
Erysimum jugicola is a subendemism of the Western Alps.

Habitat

Description
They bloom from June to August.

References

External links
 Flora Italiae
 Cooksonia
 Tela Botanica

jugicola
Perennial plants